Lakato is a rural commune in Madagascar. It belongs to the district of Moramanga, which is a part of Alaotra-Mangoro Region. The population of the commune was  21,609 in 2018.

Primary and junior level secondary education are available in town. The majority 85% of the population of the commune are farmers.  The most important crop is rice, while other important products are bananas and coffee.  Services provide employment for 15% of the population.

References and notes 

Populated places in Alaotra-Mangoro